The Caiuá Ecological Station is an ecological station in the state of Paraná, Brazil.
It was created as compensation for flooding caused by the Rosana dam on the Paranapanema River, and protects an area of Atlantic Forest to the south of the dam.

Location

The Caiuá Ecological Station (ESEC) is in the municipality of Diamante do Norte, Paraná.
It protects one of the last significant areas of exuberant seasonal semi-deciduous forest, with little disturbance by humans.
The reserve protects an area of forest near the Paranapanema River, both above and below the Rosana Hydroelectric Plant.
This was built between July 1980 and March 1987, with a  reservoir and capacity of 353MW.

History

In the area of the ESEC, what had been an inland forest became a marginal forest along the reservoir.
The government negotiated with CESP (Companhia Energética de São Paulo) for compensation for the flooding damage.

The Fazenda Macuco, which had been preserved by its owners for leisure and hunting, was located next to the hydroelectric plant.
It was expropriated in June 1989, and became the property of the state, managed by the Instituto de Terras Cartografia e Florestas (ITCF), now the 	Instituto Ambiental do Paraná (IAP).
The Caiuá Ecological Station was created by state governor decree 4.264 of 21 November 1994.

Fishing regulations were published on 2 October 2008, covering conservation areas and their buffer zones in the Paraná River basin.
They were the Morro do Diabo State Park, Rio do Peixe State Park, Aguapeí State Park, Mico Leão Preto Ecological Station, Rio Ivinhema State Park, Ilha Grande National Park, Caiuá Ecological Station and Iguaçu National Park.
The ESEC would be part of the proposed Trinational Biodiversity Corridor, which aims to provide forest connections between conservation units in Brazil, Paraguay and Argentina in the Upper Paraná ecoregion.

Environment

The terrain is flat or gently undulating.
The Köppen climate classification is "Cfa".
The ESEC is in the Atlantic Forest biome, and is mostly covered with submontane seasonal semi-deciduous forest, with some alluvial formations caused by periodic floods of the Paranapanema River.
The narrow alluvial strip in the north is dominated by Calophyllum brasiliense.
As of 2009 there had been no inventory of the fauna.

Notes

Sources

Ecological stations of Brazil
Protected areas of Paraná (state)
1994 establishments in Brazil
Protected areas established in 1994
Protected areas of the Atlantic Forest